The Prince of Temple Street is a 1992 Hong Kong crime drama film directed by Jeffrey Chiang and starring Andy Lau, Joey Wong, Deanie Ip and Ng Man-tat. Aside of portraying the titular protagonist in the film, Lau also briefly reprises his role as "Lee Rock", the real life-inspired protagonist from the film series of the same name.

Plot
Triad leader Chiu (Ray Lui) calls up a meeting hoping to find someone willing to adopt an abandoned male infant he picked up in Temple Street. During the meeting, nobody was able to stop the infant from crying until it was passed to a servant's arms. He is Tong Chau-sui (Ng Man-tat), who is chosen as the adoptive father of the infant. Because there were twelve people in the meeting and everyone were the infant's godparents, Chiu names the infant Tong Sap-yee (lit. "Tong Twelve"), whom everyone calls as "Prince Twelve".

On the surface, Prince Twelve (Andy Lau) seems like a favored person, but down his heart, he is lonelier than everyone else. His adoptive father, Chau-sui, is a worker of a mahjong house in Temple Street while his adoptive mother, Phoenix (Deanie Ip), is an ex-prostitute who claims to have abandoned his son in Temple Street on the same day Twelve was abandoned, and thus, treats Prince Twelve as her biological son.

The renowned Prince Twelve has a rival named Lap Ling (Chin Ho), who is the leader of the Kwoon Chung Gang and a person more terrible than a devil. One day, Prince Twelve meets a girl who came preaching at Temple Street named Teresa (Joey Wong). From the first moment he looked at her, he fell in love with her.

Cast
Andy Lau as Prince Twelve / Lee Rock
Joey Wong as Teresa
Deanie Ip as Phoenix
Ng Man-tat as Tong Chau-sui
Chin Ho as Lap Ling
Ray Lui as Chiu (cameo)
Charles Heung as Lam Kong (cameo)
Lau Siu-ming as Ho (cameo)
Lau Kong as Ngan Tung (cameo)
Amy Yip as Ha (cameo)
Wong Chi-keung as Piggy (cameo)
Kent Cheng as Cheng (cameo)
Jamie Luk as Little Ma (cameo)
Frankie Chan as Peter Pan
Jameson Lam as Motel manager
Wan Seung-lam as Kin's man
Leung Kam-san as Uncle Tsuen
Kingdom Yuen as Phoenix's hooker
Choi Kwok-hing as Kwan
Jeffrey Lam as Uncle Kin
Carol Lee as Smartie's girlfriend
Danny Poon as Cheating
Leung Kai-chi as White haired old man
Fong Yue as Brothel Spruiker
Ho Chi-moon
Kong Foo-keung as Uncle Fat's thug
Choi Cho-kuen as Uncle Fat's thug
Annabelle Lau
Tang Cheung
Wong Kim-ban
Lo Kwok-wai
Lee Ka-hung

Theme song
Things I Used to Hold Tight On (從前我所緊抱的)  / Me and the Dreams I Chase (我和我追逐的夢) 
Composer: Steve Chow
Lyricist: Calvin Poon , Steve Chow 
Singer: Andy Lau

Box office
The film grossed HK$12,620,570 at the Hong Kong box office during its theatrical run from 20 August to 3 September 1992 in Hong Kong.

See also
Andy Lau filmography

External links

The Prince of Temple Street at Hong Kong Cinemagic

1992 films
1992 crime drama films
1990s action films
1992 romantic drama films
Hong Kong crime drama films
Hong Kong action films
Triad films
1990s Cantonese-language films
Films set in Hong Kong
Films shot in Hong Kong
1990s Hong Kong films